Kevin William Glendon (born 21 June 1961) is an English former professional association footballer who played as a midfielder. After his retirement from playing, he spent 20 years in charge of Radcliffe Borough.

Glendon was with Manchester City before joining Crewe Alexandra. He played four times in the 1980–81 season before joining Hyde United. He joined Burnley in December 1983, but was limited to four league appearances there as well and, after being released in May 1984, joined Witton Albion. He joined Mossley in September 1984, where he remained until being transferred to Northwich Victoria, for a fee of £200, in October 1986.

He became the regional director of coaching for the players' union, quitting in 1990 to become the full-time manager of Radcliffe Borough. In September 2010, Glendon resigned as manager of Radcliffe, ending a 20-year relationship with the club.

His son George is also a professional footballer.

References
General

Specific

1961 births
Living people
Footballers from Manchester
English footballers
Association football midfielders
Manchester City F.C. players
Crewe Alexandra F.C. players
Hyde United F.C. players
Burnley F.C. players
Witton Albion F.C. players
Mossley A.F.C. players
Northwich Victoria F.C. players
Macclesfield Town F.C. players
English Football League players